Eliza Gilkyson (born August 24, 1950, Hollywood, California) is a Taos, New Mexico-based folk musician. She is the daughter of songwriter and folk musician Terry Gilkyson and his wife, Jane. Her brother is guitarist Tony Gilkyson, who played with the Los Angeles-based bands Lone Justice and X. She is married to scholar and author Robert Jensen. Gilkyson is a two-time Grammy Award nominee, receiving a nomination for Best Contemporary Folk Album in 2004 and Best Folk Album in 2014.

Career

Gilkyson released Eliza '69, her first album, in 1969 while raising a family in Santa Fe, New Mexico. She didn't come out with her second, Love from the Heart, until ten years later. She moved to Austin, Texas in 1981 and released the commercial album Pilgrims before moving to Los Angeles in 1987.

After a brief stint in Los Angeles, she returned to New Mexico in the early 1990s, releasing several albums of original material. In 1993 she collaborated with New Age artist Andreas Vollenweider on his recording, Eolian Minstrel.

She has been with Red House Records since 2000, although she also worked on three albums independently, recording on her own label, Realiza Records. In 2003 she was inducted into the Texas Music Hall of Fame. Her third album with Red House Records, Land of Milk and Honey was released in 2004, and was nominated for a Grammy. In 2005, she released Paradise Hotel with the song "Requiem" about the 2004 Indian Ocean earthquake and tsunami in December 2004. Coinciding with Hurricane Katrina's devastation of the Gulf Coast region in August 2005, this song found its way to listeners as a song of prayer and comfort. The same year she was recognized with 3 Austin Music Awards and 4 Folk Alliance Music Awards, one of which was for her song "Man of God" about the Bush administration.

In 2008, her album Beautiful World came out, again on Red House Records. The songs vary from pop to folk and points in-between, with songs ranging from intimate ballads to rallying cries against the imperialist machine. In 2010, she collaborated on a new album entitled Red Horse with two of her Red House Records label-mates John Gorka and Lucy Kaplansky.

In 2011, she came out with Roses at the End of Time, and in 2014 released The Nocturne Diaries which was Grammy nominated for best Folk Album. Both CDs were recorded at her home with the help of her son and co-producer Cisco Ryder.

In 2020, she released 2020, described as "a collection of politically charged anthems."

She continues to tour about 150 dates per year in the United States and overseas, as well as hosting annual songwriting workshops near Taos, New Mexico.

Discography

Albums
1969 – Eliza '69, Mont Clare Records (out of print)
1979 – Love from the Heart, as Lisa Gilkyson, Helios Records (out of print)
1982 – No Commercial Potential, as Lisa Gilkyson, Wind River Productions (cassette - out of print)
1984 – Eliza Gilkyson / Mark Hallman, SouthCoast Records (EP - out of print)
1987 – Pilgrims, Gold Castle Records
1988 – Legends of Rainmaker, Gold Castle Records (out of print)
1992 – Through the Looking Glass, Private Music (out of print but may be reissued in the future)
1993 – Eolian Minstrel by Andreas Vollenweider, vocals, acoustic guitar, and lyrical co-author, although Gilkyson's credit only appears in the liner notes, Capitol Records
1994 – Undressed, Realiza Records (out of print)
1997 – Redemption Road, Silverwave Records
1999 – Misfits, Realiza Records
2000 – Hard Times in Babylon, Red House Records
2001 – More Than a Song, with Ad Vanderveen and Iain Matthews, Perfect Pitch Productions
2002 – Lost and Found, Red House Records
2004 – Land of Milk and Honey, Red House Records
2005 – RetroSpecto, Realiza Records
2005 – Paradise Hotel, Red House Records
2007 – Your Town Tonight, Red House Records
2008 – Beautiful World, Red House Records
2010 – Red Horse with John Gorka and Lucy Kaplansky, Red House Records
2011 – Roses At The End Of Time, Red House Records
2014 – The Nocturne Diaries, Red House Records
2018 – Secularia, Red House Records
2020 – 2020, Red House Records
2022 – Songs from the River Wind, Howling Dog Records

DVDs
2008 - Live From Austin, Texas

See also
 Music of Austin

References

External links
 Texas Music Hall of Fame Singer/Songwriter Eliza Gilkyson, The Rag Blog, December 21, 2011 (with podcast of Thorne Dreyer's December 16, 2011, Rag Radio interview with Eliza Gilkyson, including live performance—55:48)

1950 births
Living people
American women singers
American folk singers
Musicians from Austin, Texas
Songwriters from California
Singers from Los Angeles
Songwriters from Texas
Private Music artists
Red House Records artists
21st-century American women